Kuala Kurun (abbreviated: KKN), a sub-district in the district of Kurun, is the regency seat of Gunung Mas Regency and also one of the towns in Central Kalimantan. This town is located 163 km north of Palangka Raya city, the capital of Central Kalimantan Province. The population of this town is roughly 12,870 people as of 2021.

Geography 

Kuala Kurun is located 1.101614 S and 113.866383 E. The town is located to the north of Palangka Raya, the capital of Central Kalimantan with the distance about 163 km. The total area of this town is around 121 km² which makes it roughly 1.12% of the total area of Gunung Mas Regency.

Kuala Kurun is crossed by several rivers, but the main one is Kahayan River which also one of the most important rivers in Central Kalimantan. This town is situated on a quite hilly land to the south of Schwaner mountains and to north of Central Kalimantan lowlands. The altitude of this town is 73 metres above sea level. Due to its adjacency to the equator, this town experiences tropical equatorial climate (Af) with huge amounts of rainfall all year long, constant high humidity and warm-to-hot temperature.

Demographics 
The population of Kuala Kurun as of 2021 is about 12,870 inhabitants which represents 38.6% of the population of Kurun district and 9.5% of the entire population of Gunung Mas Regency. The population density of this town is roughly 106.36/km². As of 2021, there are 4,052 households and the average household size is about 3.2 people. The sex ratio of Kuala Kurun is 107 which means there are 107 males to every 100 females.

Education 
As of 2021, there are seven primary schools (five public schools & two private school), three middle schools (one public & two private schools), three high schools (one public school & two private schools), and two vocational schools (one public school & one private school).

Facilities 
For health facility, Kuala Kurun recently has one general hospital, six pharmacies, and one public health centre. For economic facilities, this town currently has three shopping complexes, two markets, four minimarkets, four banks, and twelve restaurants. Kuala Kurun has also 35 religious facilities, those are fourteen Islamic religious facilities, twenty Christian churches, and one Hindu/Kaharingan temple. This town is also served by the Sangkalemu Kuala Kurun Airport which located at neighboring sub-district of Tampang Tumbang Anjir.

Reference 

Populated places in Central Kalimantan
Regency seats of Central Kalimantan
Gunung Mas Regency